Zachary Sheridan Neal (born November 9, 1988) is an American professional baseball pitcher who is a free agent. He previously played in Major League Baseball (MLB) for the Oakland Athletics and the Los Angeles Dodgers.

Career

Florida/Miami Marlins
Neal played college baseball at Sam Houston State University, Howard College, and the University of Oklahoma. He was drafted by the Florida Marlins in the 17th round of the 2010 Major League Baseball draft. He made his professional debut with the GCL Marlins and also played for the Low-A Jamestown Jammers, accumulating a 2-1 record and 1.44 ERA in 7 games. In 2011, Neal played for the Single-A Greensboro Grasshoppers, posting a 7-6 record and 4.16 ERA in 22 appearances. The next year, he split the season between the High-A Jupiter Hammerheads and the Double-A Jacksonville Suns, pitching to a cumulative 8-7 record and 2.78 ERA with 78 strikeouts in 30 games.

Oakland Athletics
On March 31, 2013, Neal signed a minor league contract with the Oakland Athletics. He was assigned to the Double-A Midland RockHounds, where he spent the season, registering an 8-12 record and 4.35 ERA with 96 strikeouts in 165.2 innings of work. In 2014, Neal split the season between the High-A Stockton Ports, Midland, and the Triple-A Sacramento River Cats, logging a 10-7 record and 3.09 ERA in 27 appearances between the three teams. In 2015, Neal split the year between the Triple-A Nashville Sounds and Midland, pitching to a 10-13 record and 4.67 ERA with 100 strikeouts in 167.2 innings pitched.

Neal was called up to the majors for the first time on May 11, 2016. Despite posting a low strikeout rate (3.5), Neal was a solid contributor for Oakland, appearing in 24 games, 6 spot starts. He finished with a 2-4 record and 2 saves. On January 18, 2017, he was designated for assignment by Oakland. He cleared waivers and was assigned to Triple-A Nashville. He began the 2017 season with Nashville, but was called up to the Athletics on May 24. He was twice optioned back to Nashville and recalled during the season before being designated for assignment on August 16. On the year, he recorded a 7.98 ERA in 6 appearances. He elected to become a free agent after the season.

Los Angeles Dodgers
On January 6, 2018, Neal signed a minor league contract that included an invite to spring training with the Los Angeles Dodgers. He was added to the Dodgers major league roster on April 3. After pitching in one inning for the Dodgers, he was designated for assignment on April 5.

Cincinnati Reds
On April 17, 2018, the Dodgers traded Neal and Ibandel Isabel to the Cincinnati Reds in exchange for Ariel Hernández. He was assigned to the Louisville Bats. Neal pitched to a 2-2 record and 5.90 ERA with 23 strikeouts in 39.2 innings of work.

Los Angeles Dodgers (second stint)
However, on July 4, 2018, Neal was traded back to the Dodgers organization (along with Dylan Floro and international bonus pool space) in exchange for James Marinan and Aneurys Zabala. He pitched in 14 games for the Triple-A Oklahoma City Dodgers, starting 11 of them, and finished with a 3–2 record and 4.40 ERA. Neal declared free agency on October 11, 2018.

Saitama Seibu Lions
Neal signed with the Saitama Seibu Lions of Nippon Professional Baseball for the 2019 season. He finished his first NPB season with a 12-1 record and 2.87 ERA with 51 strikeouts in 100.1 innings of work. In 2020, Neal pitched to a 6-8 record and 5.22 ERA in 21 games. In 2021, Neal made 11 appearances, going 1–6 with a 5.85 ERA and 26 strikeouts. He became a free agent following the season.

Colorado Rockies
On February 18, 2022, Neal signed a minor league contract with the Colorado Rockies. He elected free agency on November 10, 2022.

References

External links

1988 births
Living people
Baseball players from South Carolina
Major League Baseball pitchers
Oakland Athletics players
Los Angeles Dodgers players
Sam Houston Bearkats baseball players
Howard Hawks baseball players
Oklahoma Sooners baseball players
Gulf Coast Marlins players
Jamestown Jammers players
Greensboro Grasshoppers players
Jupiter Hammerheads players
Jacksonville Suns players
Midland RockHounds players
Stockton Ports players
Sacramento River Cats players
Nashville Sounds players
Oklahoma City Dodgers players
Louisville Bats players
Saitama Seibu Lions players
Nippon Professional Baseball pitchers